This is a progressive list of football players who have held or co-held the record for goals scored for the Scotland national football team. The list begins with Henry Renny-Tailyour and William Gibb, who both scored in the 4–2 defeat by England in March 1873. The first official international game, contested by the same teams in November 1872, had finished goalless. The record is shared by Denis Law and Kenny Dalglish, with 30 goals each.

Criteria
For the early decades, records of players appearances and goals were often considered unreliable. RSSSF and IFFHS have spent much effort trying to produce definitive lists of full international matches, and corresponding data on players' international caps and goals. Using this data, the following records can be retrospectively produced. Note that, at the time, these records may not have been recognised.

Record

See also
 Scotland national football team records

Notes

References

External links
 Scotland Record Goal Scorers, London Hearts Supporters' Club
 Players with 100+ Caps and 30+ International Goals, RSSSF

Goalscoring record
Scotland goalscoring record